Johann Josef Andres (17 June 1887 – 25 May 1970) was an Austrian footballer. He played in six matches for the Austria national football team from 1908 to 1912. He was also part of Austria's squad for the football tournament at the 1912 Summer Olympics, but he did not play in any matches.

References

External links 
 

1887 births
1970 deaths
Austrian footballers
Austria international footballers
Footballers from Vienna
Wiener AC players
Wiener AF players
Association football forwards
Austrian football managers
FK Austria Wien managers